The women's ski cross competition in freestyle skiing at the 2022 Winter Olympics was held on 17 February, at the Genting Snow Park in Zhangjiakou. Sandra Näslund of Sweden won the event, which was her first Olympic medal. Marielle Thompson of Canada, the 2014 champion, won the silver medal. The bronze medal was split between Fanny Smith of Switzerland and Daniela Maier of Germany following a Court of Arbitration of Sport decision on 13 December 2022 in regards to an interference call in the final.

The 2018 champion, Kelsey Serwa, retired from competitions. The silver medalist Brittany Phelan and the bronze medalist Fanny Smith qualified for the Olympics. At the 2021–22 FIS Freestyle Ski World Cup, before the Olympics, Näslund won all events but one and consequently led the ranking, followed by Smith. Näslund was also the 2021 world champion, while Smith was the silver medalist.

Bronze medal controversy
Fanny Smith of Switzerland, the 2018 bronze medalist, initially crossed the line in third place and thought she had won the bronze medal. Daniela Maier of Germany finished fourth. However, following a 10-minute review by race judges, Smith was penalised for a clash with Maier, so at the awards ceremony on 17 February 2022 Maier was awarded the bronze.

On 26 February 2022, after the end of the Olympic Games, following an appeal from Fanny Smith, the FIS Appeals Commission made the decision to overturn the FIS Jury decision. As a result of winning the appeal, Smith was promoted to third place, while Maier officially finished in fourth place, which was reflected on the FIS website.

FIS has no right to make a decision on the return and redistribution of medals, as this issue is in the exclusive competence of the IOC; therefore, in its decision, the FIS Appeals Commission did not mention any words about the medals and their redistribution, and the IOC has the last word in this issue. On 13 December 2022, the Court of Arbitration for Sport decided both competitors will be awarded duplicate bronze medals and share joint third place.

Qualification

A total of 30 ski cross athletes qualified to compete at the games. For an athlete to compete they must have a minimum of 80.00 FIS points on the FIS Points List on January 17, 2022 and a top 30 finish in a World Cup event or at the FIS Freestyle Ski World Championships 2021. A country could enter a maximum of four athletes into the event.

Results

Seeding run

Elimination round

1/8 finals

Heat 1

Heat 2

Heat 3

Heat 4

Heat 5

Heat 6

Heat 7

Heat 8

Quarterfinals

Heat 1

Heat 2

Heat 3

Heat 4

Semifinals

Heat 1

Heat 2

Finals
Small final

Big final

References

Women's freestyle skiing at the 2022 Winter Olympics